George Albert Anderson (6 June 1887 – 28 May 1956) was an English professional footballer, best remembered for his 10 years as manager of Dundee between 1944 and 1954. As a player, Anderson played as a goalkeeper and made over 200 Scottish League appearances for Aberdeen. He also played in the Football League for Sunderland. Between his retirement as a player as his appointment as manager of Dundee, Anderson served Aberdeen as a director and manager.

Personal life 
Anderson served in the Royal Artillery during the First World War.

Career statistics

Club

Manager

Honours 
Dundee
 Southern League B Division: 1945–46
Scottish League Division B: 1946–47
Scottish League Cup: 1951–52, 1952–53
Individual
 Dundee Hall of Fame

References

1887 births
Association football goalkeepers
English footballers
Dundee F.C. players
English football managers
Dundee F.C. managers
1956 deaths
Footballers from Northumberland
English Football League players
Sunderland A.F.C. players
Aberdeen F.C. players
Military personnel from Northumberland
Aberdeen F.C. directors and chairmen
Aberdeen F.C. managers
Dundee F.C. non-playing staff
Royal Artillery personnel
British Army personnel of World War I
20th-century Scottish businesspeople
Councillors in Aberdeen